Luis Jara may refer to: 

 Luis Jara (singer) (born 1965), Chilean singer as Lucho Jara
 Luis Jara (album), an album by the singer, released in 2002
 Luis Jara (Chilean footballer), a Chilean footballer
 Luis Jara (Paraguayan footballer) (born 1965), a Paraguayan footballer
 Luis Jara (Costa Rican footballer), a Costa Rican footballer

Human name disambiguation pages